The following is a list of episodes for the British sitcom Still Open All Hours, first broadcast on BBC One on 26 December 2013. The series is a sitcom sequel to Open All Hours, which broadcast from 1973 to 1985. There have so far been a total of six series and forty-one episodes, of which one was a 40th Anniversary special and Six have been Christmas specials.

Series overview

Episode list

Christmas Special (2013)
This episode marked the 40th anniversary of original show, Open All Hours.

Series 1 (2014–15)

Series 2 (2015–16)
On 13 September 2015, the BBC confirmed that Still Open All Hours would return for a second series, which began airing in December 2015.

Series 3 (2017)

On 20 January 2016, David Jason confirmed that Still Open All Hours would return for a third series in December 2016. This is the first series not to feature Lynda Baron's character, Nurse Gladys Emanuel.

Series 4 (2018)
On 14 January 2017, David Jason revealed that he will be returning to film more episodes towards the end of 2017.

Series 5 (2018)
In January 2018, it was revealed the show will return for a fifth series late 2018.

Series 6 (2019)
In  December 2018, it was revealed the show will return for a sixth series late 2019. Episodes 5 and 6 were originally scheduled for 22 and 29 November 2019 respectively, but were delayed due to the 2019 General Election broadcasts.

References

External links
 Still Open All Hours BBC episode list
 
 

Lists of British sitcom episodes